James P. Conway (August 4, 1910 - May 31, 1984) was an American Hall of Fame trainer in Thoroughbred horse racing who trained forty-three stakes winners including five Champions and a winner of two American Classic Races.

Before becoming a professional trainer in 1946, Conway worked at various racetrack jobs. His first major client was Dallas, Texas hotel owner Ben Whitaker for whom "Jimmy" Conway conditioned the 1948 and 1953 American Champion Three-Year-Old Filly, Miss Request and Grecian Queen. Whitaker died in April 1954, and Conway's next Champion was with another filly named Pucker Up. Owned by Ada L. Rice, Pucker Up was the 1957 American Champion Older Female Horse. 

From 1962 to 1966 Jimmy Conway trained for John Galbreath's Darby Dan Farm with whom he would enjoy his greatest success. In his first year with Darby Dan, Conway conditioned the filly Primonetta to 1962 American Champion Older Female Horse honors then the following year won two of the U.S. Triple Crown races with Chateaugay. The colt won the 1963 Kentucky Derby at 1¼ miles, finished second to Candy Spots in the 1³/16 mile Preakness Stakes, then won the 1½  mile Belmont Stakes. Chateaugay would be Conway's fifth Champion, voted 1963 American Champion Three-Year-Old Male Horse.

Besides his 1963 win in the Kentucky Derby, Conway had four other horses who ran in the prestigious race: 1948 (3rd), 1957 (6th), 1968 (2nd), 1970 (12th).

After leaving the Darby Dan stable, in 1967 Conway returned to operating a public stable, training horses for notable owners such as Maxwell Gluck's Elmendorf Farm.

Following a lengthy illness, Jimmy Conway died at age seventy-three at Nassau Hospital in Mineola on Long Island, New York. In 1996 he was inducted in the United States' National Museum of Racing and Hall of Fame.

References
 June 1, 1984 New York Times obituary for James P. Conway
 James P. Conway at the National Museum of Racing and Hall of Fame

1910 births
1984 deaths
American horse trainers
United States Thoroughbred Racing Hall of Fame inductees
People from Nassau County, New York